Ten (núi Ten) is a mountain of the Xuân Sơn National Park in Phú Thọ Province in northern Vietnam. It is the second highest point in the park at 1244 metres.

References

Mountains of Vietnam
Landforms of Phú Thọ province